"White and Black Blues" was the  entry in the Eurovision Song Contest 1990, performed in French (with some words in English) by Joëlle Ursull, from her album Black French. The song was performed fourteenth on the night of the competition. At the close of voting, it had received 132 points, tying for second place in a field of 22.

Background and writing
The rewritten version met with her approval and has become something of a fan favourite.

The song itself deals with the need to overcome the prejudices of skin colour. Ursull sings, "when someone talks to me about skin colour / I have the blues which sends shivers down my spine / I feel as if I'm in a tale by Edgar Allan Poe". That said, she does not believe in relinquishing her connection to Africa entirely ("Africa, my love, I have you in my skin"), but admits that she faces difficulties in a white society ("we, the blacks / we're a few millions, a dime a dozen").

Musically, the song features an accordion as well as the synthesiser effects starting to appear at the contest in the early 1990s. The song is in triple metre, with the verses following an unusual phrasing of seven triplets per phrase,  and the chorus with a more conventional eight triplets per phrase.

It was succeeded as French representative at the 1991 contest by Amina with "Le Dernier qui a parlé...".

Chart performance 
"White and Black Blues" had a great success in France and was one of the summer hits of 1990. It debuted at number 47 on 26 May 1990 and reached number two seven weeks later, but was unable to top the chart, as Zouk Machine, Ursull's former band, was then number one with "Maldòn". The single remained in the top ten for 18 weeks and left the top 50 after 26 weeks of presence, and was certified Gold disc by the Syndicat National de l'Édition Phonographique. In Sweden and Germany, the single achieved a minor success, peaking respectively at number 19 and number 86. It was also a top ten hit in Austria.

On the Eurochart Hot 100, "White and Black Blues" debuted at number 76 on 16 June 1990, peaked at number nine in its seventh week, and totalled ten weeks in the top twenty and 23 weeks on the chart. It ranked number 30 on the European year-end chart. It was also much aired on radio, spending 12 weeks on the European Airplay Top 50 Chart with a peak at number 11 in its fourth week, and was number two on French both AM and PM airplay charts on 28 July 1990.

Track listings 
 CD single
 "White and Black Blues" — 3:00
 "White and Black Blues" (instrumental) — 3:00

 7" single
 "White and Black Blues" — 3:00
 "White and Black Blues" (instrumental) — 3:00

Charts and certifications

Weekly charts

Year-end charts

Certifications

External links
 Official Eurovision Song Contest site, history by year, 1990
 Detailed info & lyrics, The Diggiloo Thrush, "White and Black Blues".

References 

1990 singles
Joëlle Ursull songs
CBS Records singles
Eurovision songs of 1990
Eurovision songs of France
Songs written by Serge Gainsbourg
1990 songs
Songs against racism and xenophobia